Nicky Lee (born November 26, 1980) is a Korean American singer and actor.

Born and raised in Los Angeles, California, Lee gained his initial fame as part of the Taiwanese hip hop group, Machi. Following the group's success, Lee released his first full-length Mandarin solo album, Shadow, in 2005.

In 2007, Lee was named Best Mandarin Male Singer at the 18th Golden Melody Awards.

He is also known for his work with music group Aziatix.

Personal life
He married Japanese television personality Akane Sōma in 2014.

Discography

Studio albums

Singles

Filmography

Television series

Film

Awards and nominations

References

External links
 
 
 

1980 births
Living people
Singers from Los Angeles
Male actors from Los Angeles
American male television actors
American male film actors
21st-century American male actors
21st-century American singers
American expatriates in Taiwan
Korean Mandopop singers
American musicians of Korean descent
American male actors of Korean descent
21st-century American male singers